Nesvady (Hungarian pronunciation:) is a town and municipality in the Komárno District in the Nitra Region of south-west Slovakia.

Geography
The town lies at an altitude of 114 metres and covers an area of 57.861 km² on the left bank of the Nitra river, around 23 km north of Komárno,  10 km north-east of Hurbanovo,  and 7 km south-west of Nové Zámky. Administratively, the town belongs to the Nitra Region, Komárno District.

History
In the 11th century, the territory of Nesvady became part of the Kingdom of Hungary.
In historical records the town was first mentioned in 1269 as Naswod.
After the Austro-Hungarian army disintegrated in November 1918, Czechoslovak troops occupied the area, in the 1920, by the Treaty of Trianon the town became part of Czechoslovakia. Between 1938 and 1945 Nesvady became part of Miklós Horthy's Hungary through the First Vienna Award. In 1945, it was recovered by Czechoslovakia. A number of residents were affected by the Beneš decrees and a number of families were forced to move to Hungary in 1947. From 1945 until the Velvet Divorce, it was part of Czechoslovakia. Since then it has been part of Slovakia.

Demographics
Nesvady has a population of about 5,000 people. The ethnic make-up is about 60% Hungarian, 35% Slovak, and 5% Romany.

Facilities
The town has a public library, a gym and a football pitch.

References

http://www.nesvady.sk
http://nesvady.baptist.sk

Komárno District
Hungarian communities in Slovakia